The Lobster College is a four-day-long educational program held in Prospect Harbor, Maine. The college has been held every year since 2001. It was founded by Dr. Robert Bayer via the Lobster Institute, and a local innkeeper, to help educate tourists and the general public about lobsters, lobstering, and the effects of the lobster industry on the state economy. Lecturers include academics, lobster fishermen, and others involved in the seafood industry such as restaurant owners.

References

Seafood organizations
Economy of Maine
Education in Maine
United States educational programs
True lobsters
2001 establishments in Maine